Friedrich-Wilhelm-Platz is a Berlin U-Bahn station located on the . It opened for service in 1971.

The station was built adjacent to "Zum Guten Hirten" church (1893) on Friedrich-Wilhelm-Platz, which was named after Friedrich Wilhelm of Prussia, who became emperor under the name Friedrich III, and died after only 99 days' reign. In 1946 there was a proposal to rename the station to Engelsplatz, which was not carried out.

Notes 

U9 (Berlin U-Bahn) stations
Buildings and structures in Tempelhof-Schöneberg
Railway stations in Germany opened in 1971